Flan may refer to:

Flan (pie), an open sweet or savoury tart, the most common UK meaning
Flan cake, a Filipino cake topped with crème caramel and caramel syrup
Flan de leche or crème caramel, a custard dessert with clear caramel sauce, the most common US meaning
Flan or planchet, a blank metal disk to be struck as a coin

Popular culture
Flans, a Mexican vocal trio
Flan, a race in the World of Greyhawk campaign setting Flanaess
Flan (album), a 1992 album by Dogbowl

See also
Flam (disambiguation)